Frank Arnau (March 9, 1894 – February 11, 1976) was the pseudonym of a German crime fiction writer, born as Heinrich Schmitt.

Biography 
Arnau was born in Vienna, the son of a hotel manager.

He began his literary career as a newspaper journalist. With the political ascent of Hitler, this avowed opponent of National Socialism emigrated in 1933, first to France, then in 1939 to Brazil, where he lived until 1955. There he was further active as journalist and freelance writer. After his return to Germany he worked as a freelancer for Stern magazine.

Arnau wrote over a hundred books and was president of the German league for human rights.
He wrote stage plays, novels, detective stories and critical studies about society and the legal system. 
In 1934 he described the ascent of the Nazis in his novel Die braune Pest (The Brown Plague).

In 1959 he published a book about counterfeiting art, entitled Kunst der Fälscher – Fälscher der Kunst. 3000 Jahre Betrug mit Antiquitäten (translated in English as The Art of the Faker - 3,000 Years of Deception).

He died at Munich in 1976.

Works

Crime Fiction 
1929 Der geschlossene Ring
1933 Männer der Tat
1944 Die Maske mit dem Silberstreifen
1953 Auch sie kannten Felix Umballer
1956 Pekari Nr 7
1957 Tanger nach Mitternacht
1957 Verwandlung nach Mitternacht
1957 Mordkommission Hollywood
1957 Der geschlossene Ring
1958 Nur tote Zeugen schweigen
1958 Jenseits aller Schranken
1958 Heisses Pflaster Rio
1958 Heißes Pflaster Rio
1959 Nur tote Zeugen schweigen
1959 Lautlos wie sein Schatten
1960 Der perfekte Mord
1960 Der letzte Besucher
1960 Das andere Gesicht
1961 Die Dame im Chinchilla
1961 Der letzte Besucher
1962 Heroin AG
1962 Im Schatten der Sphinx
1963 Der Mord war ein Regiefehler
1963 Schuss ohne Echo
1963 Verwandlung nach Mitternacht
1964 Der Mord war ein Regiefehler
1965 Mit heulenden Sirenen
1968 Das verbrannte Gesicht
1984 Das verschlossene Zimmer (posthumous)

Others 
1934 Die braune Pest
1959 Kunst der Fälscher - Fälscher der Kunst. 3000 Jahre Betrug mit Antiquitäten.
 1960 Brasilia. Phantasie und Wirklichkeit. Prestel-Verlag, München.
1962 Im Schatten der Sphinx
1964 Warum Menschen töten
1966 Jenseits der Gesetze
1967 Die Straf-Unrechtspflege in der Bundesrepublik
1971 Tatmotiv Leidenschaft
1972 Lexikon der Philatelie
1972 Gelebt, geliebt, gehasst (autobiography)
1974 Watergate - Der Sumpf

Films 
Täter gesucht (1931, based on the novel Der geschlossene Ring)
Contest (1932)

External links 
 
Frank Arnau im Lexikon der deutschen Krimi-Autoren, Internet-Edition

1894 births
1976 deaths
Writers from Vienna
German crime fiction writers
German male journalists
German male novelists
20th-century German novelists
20th-century German male writers
20th-century German journalists